is the 11th single of the Japanese band High and Mighty Color, released on December 11, 2007.

Overview
Amazing is the band's eleventh single. The song returns to a more rock oriented sound in contrast to the tenth and ninth singles from the band, both ballads. The title song was used as the theme to a series of Ekiden races held in Japan while the b-side song, Parade, was used as the theme to the 2007-2008 Japanese football season and as a Nabisco commercial song. The single was originally going to contain a song known as Size, but was removed for unknown reasons. The music video for the single was released on November 28, 2007. The single was released in both special and nonspecial editions, the special edition contain a DVD which includes the music video for Amazing as well as a documentary on the summer 2007 tour narrated in parts by each member. During its release, the single achieved the 14th spot on its first day on the daily Oricon music charts and 30th in its first week. The single sold 3,873 copies in its first week.

During an interview given for music magazine Any Music, Maki and Yusuke stated the title track was written as a song meant to inspire those who are depressed during the winter months. Maki stated that she and Yusuke wrote the title song with an inspirational meaning because the hardships a mutual friend was undergoing at the time. Yusuke went on to say that he wanted to have a more upbeat song after their previous single, Dreams, which was a song about the sadness of breaking up and felt that his friend's hardship gave him the inspiration needed to write the song.

Music video
The music video for Amazing opens up to a miniature carousel being played. As the music begins, the band is shown on an empty stage and Maki begins to sing. The rest of the video showcases the band playing the song throughout an abandoned theater.

Track list
 "Amazing"  
Lyrics: Maki & Yuusuke
Music: SASSY
 "Secret Heart" 
Lyrics: Maki & Yuusuke
Music: SASSY
 "Parade"  
Lyrics: Yuusuke
Music: HIGH and MIGHTY COLOR
 "Amazing -Instrumental-"

Charts
Oricon Sales Chart (Japan)

2007 singles
High and Mighty Color songs
2007 songs